Bøving Island  is a small Antarctic island in the south part of Newcomb Bay, lying  east of McMullin Island in the Windmill Islands. It was first mapped from air photos taken by USN Operation Highjump in 1946 and 1947. Named by ANCA for F. Bøving, third officer on MV Thala Dan in 1965, who assisted in a hydrographic survey in the vicinity.

See also 
 Composite Antarctic Gazetteer
 List of Antarctic and sub-Antarctic islands

External links

Windmill Islands